CDNA, cDNA or C-DNA might stand for:

Genetics
 Complementary DNA, DNA synthesized from a single-stranded RNA
 C-DNA, C form DNA, one of many possible double helical structures of DNA

Sports
 PFC CSKA Sofia, a Bulgarian professional association football club

Computer science
 Compute DNA, a graphics processing unit (GPU) instruction set architecture (ISA) by Advanced Micro Devices (AMD) for data centers and supercomputers.